The Electoral district of Glenelg may refer to:

 Electoral district of Glenelg (South Australia), a district of the South Australian House of Assembly, 1938–1985 
 Electoral district of Glenelg (Victoria), a district of the Victorian Legislative Assembly, 1904–1927